Lasha Talakhadze (born 2 October 1993) is a Georgian weightlifter, holding the all-time world records regardless of weight category in the snatch (225 kg), the clean and jerk (267 kg) and the total (492 kg) since 2021.

Talakhadze is a two-time Olympic champion, six-time world champion, and six-time European champion competing in the super-heavyweight category (105 kg + until 2018 and 109 kg + starting in 2018 after the International Weightlifting Federation reorganized the categories).
Because of his consistent tournament success and breaking of numerous world records, he is considered by many to be the greatest weightlifter of all time. He is a three-time winner of the IWF Male Lifter of the Year.

Career

Early career and +105 kg division
Talakhadze represented Georgia at the 2015 World Weightlifting Championships, and originally finished second with a total of 454 kg. In December 2015, Aleksey Lovchev (the original gold medalist and world record holder in the clean & jerk and total) failed a drug test for Ipamorelin. The IWF stripped his gold medal and rescinded his world records, and as a result Talakhadze became world champion.

At the 2016 Olympics he completed a snatch of 215 kg to break the world record of 214 kg set by Behdad Salimi (who took the record back with 216 kg, equaling the all-time highest set by Antonio Krastev of Bulgaria in 1987). In the clean & jerk portion of the competition, Behdad Salimi initially completed a 245 kg lift on his second attempt, but it was overruled by the 5 member jury, and was unable to complete his third attempt of 245 kg. Lasha then completed his next lift of 247 kg, giving him the lead after Salimi did not make a lift. He then completed a clean & jerk of 258 kg to set a new world record total of 473 kg and won the gold medal by a 22 kg margin over silver medallist Gor Minasyan.

In his first competition after winning the gold medal at the 2016 Summer Olympics, he set a new world record in the snatch at the 2017 European Weightlifting Championships with 217 kg, and in the process broke the all-time highest snatch of 216 kg set by Antonio Krastev in 1987, and matched by Behdad Salimi at the 2016 Olympics.

At the 2017 World Weightlifting Championships, Talakhadze broke his own snatch record with 220 kg, giving him a 9 kg lead over former world record holder Behdad Salimi. In the clean & jerk portion of the competition he lifted 257 kg which set a new world record for the total with 477 kg, also breaking the all-time highest total of Leonid Taranenko from 1988. In the competition he won all three gold medals, set 2 world records and had a 23 kg lead over the silver medalist Saeid Alihosseini.

+109 kg division
In 2018, the IWF restructured the weight classes and nullified the existing world records. The 2018 World Weightlifting Championships were the first international competition with new weight classes and Talakhadze competed in the +109 kg category. In the snatch portion of the competition he opened with 207 kg which placed him in the gold medal position with Gor Minasyan being the only competitor with another attempt. After Minasyan missed his third attempt, Talakhadze had the gold medal in the snatch secured. For his last two lifts, after securing the gold medal, he completed two world record lifts of 212 kg and 217 kg to put him 12 kg ahead of Minasyan after the snatch portion. In the clean & jerk portion of the competition he completed his first lift of 245 kg which set a new world record in the total, and would have won the gold medal in the total if he did not complete any more lifts. After Mart Seim failed to make a 251 kg clean & jerk, Talakhadze completed a world record lift of 252 kg for his second lift. He finished the competition with another world record lift of 257 kg, and finished with a 474 kg total, a full 24 kg over silver medalist Minasyan. 

In 2019, he competed in the 2019 European Weightlifting Championships which was held in Batumi in his home country of Georgia. Apart from being the heavy favorite to win the +109 kg category, there were expectations that Talakhadze would increase upon his current world records. In the snatch portion of the competition he lifted 208 kg in his first attempt (which would have been good for a gold medal), and then set a new world record with a 218 kg lift. Coming into the clean & jerk portion he led fellow Georgian weightlifter Irakli Turmanidze by 12 kg, and his first lift of 245 kg secured him the gold medal in the total. His second lift of 260 kg set a new world record in the clean & jerk and in the total. His total world record of 478 kg set during the competition was the highest total ever achieved in weightlifting, the previous highest of 477 kg was set by himself in 2017.

Fresh off of his victory at the 2019 European Weightlifting Championships, he again looked like the heavy favorite to win his fourth World Championships. During the snatch portion of the 2019 World Weightlifting Championships he completed a 215 kg lift which secured him a gold medal, his third lift of 220 kg tied his performance at the 2017 World Weightlifting Championships, where he lifted 220 kg in the old 105 kg category, as the heaviest snatch of all time. During the clean & jerk portion he secured gold medals in the total and clean & jerk with his second lift of 255 kg. His third lift of 264 kg in the clean & jerk set a new world record in the clean & jerk and total, his total of 484 kg was the highest total recorded in international competition in history.

In 2021, he won the gold medal in the men's +109 kg event at the 2021 World Weightlifting Championships held in Tashkent, Uzbekistan, breaking his own records in the snatch —225 kg—, the clean and jerk —267 kg— and in the total —492 kg.

Awards and other information

World records
Throughout his career he has set 26 official senior world records.

Other awards
In 2016, due to his world record setting performance at the 2016 Summer Olympics Talakhadze was awarded the President's Order of Excellence by Giorgi Margvelashvili. In 2017 and in 2018, the Georgian National Olympic Committee awarded him the title of Georgia's Sportsperson of the Year. In 2018 he was named the IWF Male Lifter of the Year for 2017. In 2019 he was named IWF Male Lifter of the Year for 2018.

2013 doping ban
In 2013, Talakhadze was banned from competition for 2 years after testing positive for the performance enhancing drug stanozolol.

Major results

Table of world records

Notes
  His 220 kg snatch was a world record until 2018 when the IWF restructured the weight classes. He has since surpassed that lift for a current personal best and world record in the +109 kg category of 225 kg set at the 2021 World Championships. His personal bests (on video in training) are 225 kg snatch and a 270 kg clean and jerk.

References

External links

 
 
 
 
 

1993 births
Living people
World Weightlifting Championships medalists
Male weightlifters from Georgia (country)
Olympic weightlifters of Georgia (country)
Olympic gold medalists for Georgia (country)
Olympic medalists in weightlifting
Weightlifters at the 2016 Summer Olympics
Medalists at the 2016 Summer Olympics
People from Sachkhere
Recipients of the Presidential Order of Excellence
European Weightlifting Championships medalists 
Doping cases in weightlifting
Weightlifters at the 2020 Summer Olympics
Medalists at the 2020 Summer Olympics
21st-century people from Georgia (country)